The following Confederate Army units and commanders fought in the Battle of Chickasaw Bayou of the American Civil War. The Union order of battle is listed separately.

Abbreviations used

Military rank
 LTG = Lieutenant General
 MG = Major General
 BG = Brigadier General
 Col = Colonel
 Ltc = Lieutenant Colonel
 Maj = Major
 Cpt = Captain
 Lt = 1st Lieutenant

Other
 w = wounded

Department of Mississippi and East Louisiana

LTG John C. Pemberton

See also

 Mississippi in the American Civil War

References
 Bearss, Edwin C. The Campaign for Vicksburg 3 vol. (Dayton, OH:  Morningside), 1985-1986.
 Johnson, Robert Underswood & Clarence Clough Buell (eds.).  Battles and Leaders of the Civil War Volume 3 (New York:  The Century Company), 1884.
 Winschel, Terrence C. Triumph & Defeat:  The Vicksburg Campaign (Mason City, IA:  Savas Pub. Co.), 1999.

American Civil War orders of battle